O'Malley of the Mounted is a 1921 American silent Western film directed by Lambert Hillyer and written by Hillyer and William S. Hart. The film stars William S. Hart, Eva Novak, Leo Willis, Alfred Allen, Bert Sprotte, and Antrim Short. The film was released on February 6, 1921, by Paramount Pictures.

Plot 
In 1921, the Motion Picture World summarized,"O'Malley of the Mounted" is a sergeant who has won his stripes by getting any criminal he is sent out to arrest, this in wild Northwestern territory amid men who dare follow their own impulses rather than obey the law.

O'Malley is assigned to arrest La Grange, a man who murdered a saloon keeper. O'Malley believes La Grange went south to escape over the border into America.

He encounters outlaws at a saloon in Forker City. He joins their gang by robbing a bank of $5,000.

He soon develops a crush on Rose Lanier and a friendship with her brother, Bud, a fugitive of the law.

Later, O'Malley fights a character named Red Jaeger who later exposes O'Malley as a Mountie and traitor. O'Malley is bound to a tree as the criminals plan to execute him at daybreak via hanging. Rose Lanier pretends to be against him, but clandestinely hands him a knife to rescue him.

According to Motion Picture World, the film concludes:By Rose and Bud the sergeant is rescued from sure death. While riding with them toward the border he confirms his suspicions that Bud is the murderer he is seeking, but finds that the killing was done to avenge a wronged sister. He leaves the brother and sister to make his report, and finds his act justified by his commanding officer. He returns to his loved one no longer "O'Malley of the Mounted."

Preservation
A copy of the film is in the Library of Congress and the Museum of Modern Art film archives.

Cast 
 William S. Hart as Sergeant O'Malley
 Eva Novak as Rose Lanier
 Leo Willis as Red Jaeger
 Alfred Allen as Big Judson
 Bert Sprotte as Sheriff
 Antrim Short as Bud Lanier

Legacy 
In 1959, the film's plot, as well as its characters, were lampooned as part of The Adventures of Rocky and Bullwinkle and Friends. The inspired segment is called Dudley Do-Right of the Mounties. Dudley Do-Right's first appearance specifically incorporates silent film tropes such as intertitles and iris shots as well as incorporating a similar plot.

References

External links 

 
 

1921 films
1921 Western (genre) films
Paramount Pictures films
Films directed by Lambert Hillyer
American black-and-white films
Surviving American silent films
Silent American Western (genre) films
1920s English-language films
1920s American films